Oberthueria formosibia is a moth in the Endromidae family. It is found in Taiwan.

Adults have a chestnut brown ground colour, with an admixture of dark yellow colours on the hindwings and sometimes a pinkish tinge in the forewings. Both wings are densely suffused with ash grey scales. The pattern is distinct, although the postmedian is vague. The submarginal fascia is white. Adults are on wing from late March to early July and again from August to early October in two generations per year.

The larvae feed on Acer species.

References

Moths described in 1927
Oberthueria (moth)
Taxa named by Shōnen Matsumura